Helen MacMurchy CBE (7 January 1862 – 8 October 1953) was a Canadian doctor, author, a pioneer in the medical field, and a prominent eugenicist.

Biography 
MacMurchy, the daughter of Archibald MacMurchy, graduated with first class honour in medicine and surgery in 1901 from the University of Toronto. She interned at Toronto General Hospital, the first woman to do so. She was also the first woman to take postgraduate work under William Osler at Johns Hopkins Hospital in Baltimore.

Some of MacMurchy's most important work included surveys of the high infant death rates experienced in cities at the turn of the century, such as 230 deaths for 1000 live births in Toronto, 1909. She resolved to combat this issue, partially because she feared the White Race was dying out. However, her extensive work in improving maternal health benefited women across Canada and worldwide through her books that talked about new techniques such as sterilization of bottles, pasteurization, and handwashing.

In 1914 MacMurchy wrote A Little Talk about the Baby, a book that mixed scholarly research with common sense. This book soon became known to all Canadian mothers. Her "Little Blue Books" would be published in dozens of languages, including Cree, until her retirement in 1934, and sold millions of copies. They encouraged good hygiene, stay-at-home mothers, and the importance of breastfeeding. One of her most quoted statements is "when the mother works, the baby dies."

It has been documented that MacMurchy held extreme dehumanizing and racist beliefs. She was a vocal and active eugenicist and in 1913 was appointed the "Inspector of the Feeble-Minded" in Ontario. Her actions led to the institutionalization and sterilization of the "feeble-minded", a pseudo-scientific category that stood in for the racialized, poor, immoral, mentally ill and otherwise undesirable persons. MacMurchy worked closely with the Women's Branch of the Immigration and Colonization Department to ensure the careful monitoring of the population. White female social workers were trained in the surveillance of the population with a particular focus on immigrant communities. Their occupation was professionalized partly because of "the need to have trained experts police new arrivals."

In the 1920s MacMurchy waged a campaign against the then high infant and maternal death rates. She made a special study of medical inspection of schools, child welfare and public health in England and in the United States. She would also become (for seven years) provincial inspector and assistant inspector of hospitals, prisons and charities.

In 1934 MacMurchy was made a Commander of the Order of the British Empire (CBE).

In 1949 she was named one of the ten leading women physicians in the western world. Among her contributions were her campaigns against high infant and maternal death rates, pioneering the link between medicine and social needs, and her writing and lecturing on maternal and child hygiene.

References
 Comacchio, Cynthia R.  Nations are Built of Babies: Saving Ontario's Mothers and Children  (Québec, PQ: MicGill-Queen's University Press, 1993),
 Nathoo, Tasnim and Aleck Ostry, The One Best Way? Breastfeeding History, Politics and Policy in Canada.  (Waterloo, ON: Wilfrid Laurier University Press, 2009).
 The Toronto Star, 13 Oct. 1953, and 26 January 1949 p. 2.

External links
 Examination of the first all-Canadian, government-sponsored childcare advice literature, written by Helen MacMurchy
 

1862 births
1953 deaths
Canadian public health doctors
Canadian Commanders of the Order of the British Empire
University of Toronto alumni
Canadian women physicians
Persons of National Historic Significance (Canada)
20th-century Canadian physicians
19th-century Canadian physicians
Canadian expatriates in the United States
20th-century women physicians
19th-century women physicians
20th-century Canadian women scientists
Women public health doctors